The Mekong River massacre occurred on the morning of 5 October 2011, when two Chinese cargo ships were attacked on a stretch of the Mekong River in the Golden Triangle region on the borders of Myanmar (Burma) and Thailand. All 13 crew members on the two ships were killed and dumped in the river.  It was the deadliest attack on Chinese nationals abroad in modern times. In response, China temporarily suspended shipping on the Mekong, and reached an agreement with Myanmar, Thailand and Laos to jointly patrol the river. The event was also the impetus for the Naypyidaw Declaration and other anti-drug cooperation efforts in the region. On 28 October 2011, Thai authorities arrested nine Pha Muang Task Force soldiers, who subsequently "disappeared from the justice system". Drug lord Naw Kham and three subordinates were eventually tried and executed by the Chinese government for their roles in the massacre.

Excessive media coverage and live broadcast of the execution were seen in Myanmar as a Chinese attempt to frame the ethnic Shans and the Burmese for the drug problems; China had previously allowed drug traffickers like Pheung Kya-shin to roam free in China. Since the KMT retreated to Myanmar in the early 1950s, ethnic Chinese drug lords have set up a drug empire in the Golden Triangle, taking advantage of their global networks, which the natives lacked. Profits from the drug trade have allowed the Chinese to expand and replace the native populations. As a result, parts of northern Myanmar and the city of Mandalay have become effectively sinicized.

Background

The Mekong is a major waterway of Southeast Asia.  It originates in China, where it is called the Lancang River, and flows through Myanmar, Laos, Thailand, Cambodia, and Vietnam, where it empties into the South China Sea. It is a major trading route between China's southwestern Yunnan Province and the countries of Southeast Asia. After leaving China the river flows through the Golden Triangle area where the borders of Myanmar, Thailand, and Laos meet. The region has long been plagued by lawlessness and is notorious for drug smuggling.  An owner of one of the hijacked ships stated that almost every Chinese boat in the area had been robbed by river gangs.

Incident
According to the crew of a different boat who witnessed the attack, about eight gunmen stormed the Chinese cargo ships Hua Ping and Yu Xing 8 in the morning of 5 October 2011.  The hijacking reportedly occurred in Burmese waters.  Later during the day Thai river police in the northernmost Chiang Rai Province recovered the ships after a gunfight, and found about 900,000 amphetamine pills worth more than US$3 million.  The bodies of the Chinese crew members were later retrieved from the river.  They had been shot or stabbed, and some had been bound or blindfolded.

Investigation
According to the police chief of Chiang Rai Province, drug gangs demanded protection money from boats on the Mekong and sometimes hijacked them to transport illegal goods.  The police suspected from the beginning that the mastermind of the massacre was Naw Kham (also spelled Nor Kham), an ethnic Shan Burmese national in his forties, an alleged drug lord and pirate in the Golden Triangle.  He was believed to be a former aide of the notorious drug kingpin Khun Sa, and leader of a gang with more than 100 members who had been involved in drug trafficking, kidnapping, murder, and piracy along the Mekong for years. However, further investigations also implicated nine Thai soldiers belonging to an elite anti-narcotics army unit.  They were also investigated by Thailand.

After a long manhunt involving Chinese and Thai authorities, in late April 2012 Lao security forces captured Naw Kham in Bokeo Province and extradited him to China in May.  Naw Kham admitted to Chinese authorities that he was responsible for the massacre, while Myanmar planned to extradite to China Naw Kham's aide who was believed to possess key information about the attack.

Criminal justice
On 6 November 2012, China's Intermediate People's Court of Kunming, Yunnan sentenced Naw Kham and three of his subordinates to death: one from Thailand, one from Laos and one that "Chinese state media referred to as stateless".  Two others, Zha Bo and Zha Tuobo, were given a death sentence with reprieve and eight years in prison, respectively.  The six defendants were fined a total of 6,000,000 yuan ($960,000).  Approximately 300 spectators were present at the verdict, including relatives of the victims, media, and diplomats from Laos and Thailand. The death sentences were carried out on 1 March 2013.

Reactions
The massacre sparked outrage among the Chinese public; China temporarily suspended all Chinese shipping on the Mekong. In December 2011 China, Myanmar, Laos and Thailand began joint patrols on the Mekong after a security agreement was reached among the four countries, with more than 200 Chinese border police from Yunnan Province taking part. It was the first such joint deployment in Southeast Asia, and is seen as an expansion of China's growing role in regional security.

Further attacks
On 4 January 2012, a Burmese patrol boat and four Chinese cargo ships were attacked on the Mekong in Myanmar. Several grenades were fired, possibly from M79 grenade launchers, but all missed the boats.

In popular culture
The film Operation Mekong (directed by Dante Lam), based on the incident, was released in September 2016.  With a box office of 1.18 billion yuan, it became one of the highest-grossing films in China.

References

2011 in China
2011 in Myanmar
2011 in Thailand
2011 murders in Thailand
2011 murders in Myanmar
October 2011 crimes
October 2011 events in Asia
2011 murders in Asia
Maritime incidents in 2011
Massacres in 2011
Chinese people murdered abroad
Organized crime events in Thailand
People murdered by organized crime
Acts of piracy
Mekong River
Chiang Rai province
China–Thailand relations